Scott Huffman (born November 30, 1964, in Quinter, Kansas) is a retired American pole vaulter. He competed in the 1988, 1992, and 1996 Olympic Trials, earning a spot as an Olympian on the 1996 Atlanta team. He had a very successful NCAA record at the University of Kansas. He won the American national championships in 1993, 1994 and 1995. At the 1994 US Championships in Knoxville, Tennessee. The result placed him third in the world on the top performers list that season. Despite his small stature, Huffman was one of the fastest vaulters in history, having been clocked at 10.0m/second on the runway, a time equalled by former world record holder Sergey Bubka and a small handful of others. Huffman's time in the 40 yard dash was 4.36 seconds (fully automatic timing).

Huffman is notable for his occasional and unpredictable use of a one-legged straddle (similar to a high jumper) method to clear the bar. This technique is commonly called "The Huffman Roll".

Achievements

References

External links
 

1964 births
Living people
American male pole vaulters
Athletes (track and field) at the 1996 Summer Olympics
Kansas Jayhawks men's track and field athletes
Olympic track and field athletes of the United States
People from Quinter, Kansas
Track and field athletes from Kansas